Moseka is a 1971 documentary film.

Synopsis 
Moseka, a young woman from Zaire, travels to Europe to study. With her braided hair and traditional clothes, she is the laughingstock of her fellow students who strive to look European, adopting wigs and European clothing. The film tells of the depersonalization of young Africans when they enter into contact with the European culture. In this sense, the film fits into the "authenticity policy" of Mobutu.

Awards
Moseka was named best short film at the 3rd Panafrican Film and Television Festival of Ouagadougou (FESPACO).

References 

1971 films
Creative Commons-licensed documentary films
Democratic Republic of the Congo short documentary films
1971 documentary films
1971 short films
1970s short documentary films
Documentary films about race and ethnicity
Zaire
1970s French-language films